Werner Schneider (born July 26, 1954) is a German former football player. He spent 12 seasons in the Bundesliga with MSV Duisburg, Borussia Dortmund and Hertha BSC.

Honours
 DFB-Pokal finalist: 1975.

External links
 

1954 births
Living people
German footballers
MSV Duisburg players
Borussia Dortmund players
Hertha BSC players
Bundesliga players
2. Bundesliga players
Association football midfielders